Caka is a Tivoid language of Cameroon. Dialects are Batanga and Asaka.

References

Languages of Cameroon
Tivoid languages